The Greek records in swimming are the fastest ever performances of swimmers from Greece, which are recognised and ratified by the Hellenic Swimming Federation (KOE).

All records were set in finals unless noted otherwise.

Long Course (50 m)

Men

Women

Mixed relay

Short Course (25 m)

Men

Women

Mixed relay

Notes

References
General
Greek Swimming Records 17 February 2023 updated
Specific

External links
KOE website

Greece
Records
Swimming
Swimming